The Cub X or Lil Cub is a STOL homebuilt aircraft.

Development
The Lil Cub is a two-place high wing strut braced aircraft with conventional landing gear and covered with Oratex Aircraft Fabric.

Operational history
The Lil Cub Prototype won the 2013 Valdez STOL competition. In mid December 2013, a fire destroyed the first build; however, the aircraft was re-built by May 2014. In 2014, Lil Cub II (Afterburner) won the Valdez STOL competition again, and went on to win the first STOL competition at AirVentures in Oshkosh.

In 2017 the aircraft set a new STOL world record at Valdez, with a take off in 13 feet 8 inches, and a landing in 10 feet 5 inches.

In 2018, the aircraft set a new STOL world record at Valdez, with a take off in 11 ft 0 inches.

Specifications (Lil Cub)

See also
Piper Cub
Super Cub

References

External links
 Valdez 2013
 Valdez 2014
 Lil Cub Interview

Homebuilt aircraft